ESdat is environmental data management, analysis and reporting software for environmental and groundwater data, developed by Earth Science Information Systems (EScIS) of Australia. Data is imported from a range of systems or sources into a central environmental database, for comparison, analysis, and reporting, where it can be filtered and viewed in formats such as tables, graphs and maps.

ESdat is used by environmental consultants, government and industry for validation, interrogation and reporting of data derived from complex environmental programs, such as contaminated and industrial sites, groundwater investigations, landfill and regulatory compliance.

It is used to manage many types of environmental data including laboratory chemistry data (analytical results, QA data, lab sample planning and electronic Chain of Custody), field chemistry data (water, gas, soil), hydrogeological data (groundwater, borehole and well construction, lithological, geotechnical and stratigraphic, LNAPL), meteorological data (rain, wind, temperature), emission data (dust, HiVol, air quality, noise), logger data, surface water flows, and flora/fauna/pest/vegetation community data.

Data can be compared against environmental standards or site-specific trigger levels to generate exceedence tables and other outputs, such as time series graphs.

References 
ESdat Information
US EPA Database and Software
Managing Site Data and the Maintenance of Conceptual Models

Environmental data
Earth sciences